Renata Aparecida da Costa (born 8 July 1986), commonly known as Renata Costa or Kóki, is a Brazilian football coach and former player, most recently an assistant coach with Iranduba. She represented the Brazil women's national football team at three editions of the FIFA Women's World Cup (2003, 2007 and 2011) and three Olympic football tournaments (2004, 2008 and 2012).

Career 
She has played as a creative midfielder for Brazil's Botucatu FC since 2005, and was a member of the Brazilian National Teams that won the silver medal at the 2004 Summer Olympics and 2008 Summer Olympics. She is known for her precise passing and goal scoring prowess.

In January 2008 Costa signed for Danish Elitedivisionen club OB Odense. Her new coach described her as a strong midfielder with good technique who could score goals and also play in defence. It was reported that Costa's transfer was one of the first involving Brazilian female players to generate a profit for the selling club.

On 24 September 2008, Costa's American transfer rights were drafted by the Saint Louis Athletica in the 2008 WPS International Draft. Instead of joining the new American franchise, she accepted a competing offer from LdB FC Malmö of the Swedish Damallsvenskan. LdB FC took over the final year of Costa's Odense contract, paying an undisclosed transfer fee to the Danish club.

In January 2014, Russian Top Division club Kubanochka Krasnodar announced the triple signing of Costa and her compatriots Danielli and Amanda Brunner. The club reached the 2014 Russian Women's Cup final, but were beaten 5–0 by Ryazan-VDV. The Brazilian players were awarded new one-year contracts by Kubanochka in February 2015.

Upon her return to Brazil, Costa joined Corinthians, who had reformed in conjunction with Grêmio Osasco Audax Esporte Clube and were known as Corinthians Audax. After helping Corinthians Audax to win the 2016 Copa do Brasil de Futebol Feminino, she signed for ambitious Amazonas-based Iranduba in October 2017. Costa retired from playing following the 2019 season, but remained at the club as an assistant coach for a time before announcing her departure in June 2020.

Despite playing as a midfielder at club level, with Brazil she played as a sweeper, notably alongside centre-backs Tânia and Aline.

Personal life

Car accident
In October 2007, Costa crashed her Opel Corsa into another car at a level crossing. She and front seat passenger Michele suffered minor injuries. Another Botucatu teammate, 16-year-old Cátia Oliveira, was asleep in the back seat and suffered a spinal cord injury, resulting in paraplegia. Costa was fined $576 for driving without a licence. Cátia, who had been called up to the Brazil women's national under-17 football team on the day of the accident, later trained as a para table tennis player and represented Brazil at the 2016 Rio Paralympics.

References

External links
  (I)
  (II)
  
 Profile at Swedish Football Association (SvFF) 
 Profile at Kubanochka Krasnodar 

1986 births
Living people
Brazilian women's footballers
Women's association football midfielders
Sportspeople from Paraná (state)
Olympic footballers of Brazil
Olympic silver medalists for Brazil
Footballers at the 2004 Summer Olympics
Footballers at the 2008 Summer Olympics
Footballers at the 2012 Summer Olympics
Footballers at the 2011 Pan American Games
2011 FIFA Women's World Cup players
Olympic medalists in football
Santos FC (women) players
Medalists at the 2008 Summer Olympics
Medalists at the 2004 Summer Olympics
Brazil women's international footballers
Pan American Games gold medalists for Brazil
Pan American Games silver medalists for Brazil
Pan American Games medalists in football
Sport Club Corinthians Paulista (women) players
Brazilian expatriate women's footballers
Brazilian expatriate sportspeople in Sweden
Brazilian expatriate sportspeople in Russia
FC Rosengård players
Kubanochka Krasnodar players
Odense Q players
Expatriate women's footballers in Denmark
Expatriate women's footballers in Sweden
Expatriate women's footballers in Russia
Brazilian expatriate sportspeople in Denmark
Damallsvenskan players
Botucatu Futebol Clube players
2007 FIFA Women's World Cup players
2003 FIFA Women's World Cup players
Medalists at the 2011 Pan American Games